Seaweed collecting is the process of collecting, drying, and pressing seaweed. It became popular as a pastime in the Victorian era and remains a hobby today.

History of seaweed collecting

Collecting seaweed can be traced back to at least the 17th century with the pressings found in Hans Sloane's Herbarium.

The pastime became increasingly popular during the Victorian Era, where it played to the burgeoning interest in natural history and collection in general. It was especially fashionable with young women, as it allowed a greater level of personal freedom. Indeed, it was so in-style that, as a young girl, Queen Victoria created her own seaweed album. The materials needed for the hobby became readily available at seaside shops. These activities also afforded women the opportunity to display their understanding and appreciation of the natural world.

Anna Atkins, thought to be the first female photographer, published the first book using photographs as illustrations. This was Photographs of British Algae: Cyanotype Impressions and contained pictures of seaweed.

The actions of some of the collectors earned them recognition and admiration from their male, professional counterparts.

These Victorian collections form valuable historical resources for morphological studies and from which genomic DNA can be extracted.

Seaweed collecting equipment
In his 1881 book, A.B. Hervey recommended the following equipment for collecting and pressing seaweed.

See also
History of phycology
Phycology

References

External links
Digitised seaweed collections at the Brooklyn Museum

Phycology
Collecting